The 1893 North Carolina Tar Heels football team represented the University of North Carolina in the 1893 college football season.  They played seven games with a final record of 3–4. The team captain for the 1893 season was A. S. Bernard. William J. "Yup" Cook (Princeton '89) was hired as the first full-time coach.

This was the first Carolina football team to wear the varsity sweater with the familiar monogram 'NC'.

Schedule

References

North Carolina
North Carolina Tar Heels football seasons
North Carolina Tar Heels football